Gustu, the quechua word for flavour, is a  restaurant and bar in La Paz, Bolivia. It opened in April 2012. Gustu is under the management of Head Chef Marsia Taha. It is considered among South America's 50 best restaurants, landing the number 32 spot on The Latin America's 50 Best Restaurants 2014 and the number 14 spot in 2017 in list made by the British magazine Restaurant.

History 
Gustu opened its doors in April 2012 and soon was noticed by major international newspapers and magazines along with its founder Claus Meyer at the front. Most noteworthy is the appearances in The New York Times, The Guardian, Financial Times, Food and Wine, Bloomberg, Eater and CNN.

Being a part of Melting Pot Bolivia, a NGO project made by Claus Meyer in cooperation with IBIS Denmark, Gustu was meant as both a   restaurant and a   cooking school. After they both experienced success, Gustu departed from Melting Pot Bolivia  and IBIS Denmark, and also created GustuBar, a Bar & Lounge with the same philosophy   as the restaurant itself.

Philosophy 
Gustu works with the philosophy that they  "can change the world through food" . Something  Claus Meyer implemented when he introduced the "Manifesto of the New Bolivian Cuisine". Most of the students at Gustu School are underprivileged youngsters from Bolivia.

Food 
Gustu applies the "kilometer 0 philosophy", meaning that all products used in their dishes and drinks are exclusively born, planted, developed and/or transformed in Bolivian territory.

Recognition 
In 2013, Gustu won Best New Restaurant  in  South America  and  Best Restaurant  in  South America, from "Como Sur – South American Gastronomy". 

In 2014, Gustu placed 32nd on the Latin America's 50 Best Restaurants  in Restaurant Magazine, and won the S. Pellegrino Best Restaurant in Bolivia  award. It again won Best Restaurant in South America   from  Como Sur – South American Gastronomy,  and Kamilla Seidler  again won the award for    Best Chef  in  South America.

In 2015, Gustu climbed 15 positions on the Latin America's 50 Best Restaurants and is now placed in place No.17.

Melting Pot and Gustu were the subject of the 2019 film A Taste of Sky, directed by Michael Lei.

References

Restaurants in Bolivia
Buildings and structures in La Paz Department (Bolivia)
2012 establishments in Bolivia
Restaurants established in 2012
Bolivian companies established in 2012